Haplobothynus is a genus of beetles in the family Carabidae, containing the following species:

 Haplobothynus gounellei Tschitscherine, 1901
 Haplobothynus paranae Tschitscherine, 1901

References

Pterostichinae